Echimys is a genus of the spiny rats family, the Echimyidae.  Members of this genus are collectively called spiny tree-rats.

Classification
The genus contains three extant species
White-faced spiny tree-rat - Echimys chrysurus
Dark spiny tree-rat - Echimys saturnus
Vieira's spiny tree-rat - Echimys vieirai

Members of the genera Callistomys, Makalata, Pattonomys, and Phyllomys were all formerly considered part of the genus Echimys.

Phylogeny
Echimys is the sister genus to Phyllomys, and then to Makalata. These taxa are closely related to the genera Pattonomys and Toromys.
In turn, these five genera share phylogenetic affinities with a clade containing the bamboo rats Dactylomys, Olallamys, Kannabateomys together with Diplomys and Santamartamys.

References

 
Rodent genera
Taxa named by Georges Cuvier